In Greek mythology, Erasus (Ancient Greek: Ἔρασος) was a member of the Arcadian royal family. He was the son of Triphylus, son of King Arcas of Arcadia.

Note

References 

 Pausanias, Description of Greece with an English Translation by W.H.S. Jones, Litt.D., and H.A. Ormerod, M.A., in 4 Volumes. Cambridge, MA, Harvard University Press; London, William Heinemann Ltd. 1918. . Online version at the Perseus Digital Library
 Pausanias, Graeciae Descriptio. 3 vols. Leipzig, Teubner. 1903. Greek text available at the Perseus Digital Library.

Characters in Greek mythology
Arcadian mythology